Events from the year 2001 in Iran.

Incumbents
 Supreme Leader: Ali Khamenei
 President: Mohammad Khatami 
 Vice President: Hassan Habibi (until September 11), Mohammad-Reza Aref (starting September 11)
 Chief Justice: Mahmoud Hashemi Shahroudi

Events
 June 8 – Mohammad Khatami is re-elected president for a next term, garnering over 75% of the vote.

See also
 Years in Iraq
 Years in Afghanistan

References

 
Iran
Years of the 21st century in Iran
2000s in Iran
Iran